is a  (spirit) said to appear in mountains in Western Japan, starting in the Kyushu region. According to mythology, it is sometimes said that they are  that have come to dwell in the mountains.

The  is the name of the Chinese  that this comes from.

Description
According to the Edo-period ,  lives in the depths of the mountains in Kyushu. It appears as a child about 10 years in age, has long perssimon and navy colored hair on its head, and has intricate fur all over its body. The  states that  has a short torso, walks upright on two long legs, and speaks in human language.

In the Kumamoto Prefecture,  hate ink lines, which are used for carpentry, so it is thought that in places where carpentry work is done in the mountains, if one uses an ink line to make lines of ink,  would not come close.

It is also said that if they are given their thank-you presents before the work is done, they sometimes run away with it. In the Ashikita District, Kumamoto, it is said that when there is a lot of work in the mountains, they say "let's ask for some help from some " and ask  for help.

They are also said to enter people's homes without permission and enter into their baths, and it is said that the baths that a  enters in would get dirty with grease floating in them as well as a very foul odor.

and  migration
In various places in the Western half of Japan, there have been confirmed to be legends where  are  that have moved into mountains. In many of them,  would move into the mountains during the autumn Higan to become , and during the spring Higan they would move back to the rivers to become .
Kumamoto Prefecture:  would move to the mountains during the autumn Higan to become  and would return to the rivers during the spring Higan to become .
Kuma District, Kumamoto Prefecture:  and  would switch with each other every February 1 (called the )
Minamata, Kumamoto Prefecture: On ,  would go from the mountains into the rivers.
Wakayama Prefecture:  would go into the mountains to become  in the autumn and would return to the rivers to become  in the springtime.
Yoshino Region, Nara Prefecture:  would go into the mountains to become  during autumn Higan and return to the rivers to become  during spring.

Is also said that if one ever tried to catch sight of the  returning to the mountains, one would fall into an illness.  refers to the landscape and places that go down from a mountain and are considered to be lands that are not suited towards building houses. In the town of Omine, Aso District, Kumamoto Prefecture, the pathway that yamawaro use to move are called .

Similar concepts
In the Hida Region (Gifu Prefecture), they are also called  and they are said to play pranks such as stealing bentō from woodcutters.

The  told about in Nishimera, Miyazaki Prefecture are said to go into mountains during the evening and return to the rivers during morning. Also, in legends in Omine, Aso District, Kumamoto Prefecture, calling them  is thought to anger them so  would be used instead as a more polite alternative.

Paintings

See also
List of Japanese legendary creatures

References

Japanese mythology
Yōkai
Kappa (folklore)
Japanese words and phrases